Somebody Like That is the fifty-first album by American singer/guitarist Glen Campbell, released in 1993.

Track listing

 "Somebody Like That" (Larry Bryant, Geoff Thurman) - 3:13
 "Those Words" (Paul Overstreet) - 2:58
 "I Will Be Here" (Steven Curtis Chapman) - 3:44
 "Love's Old Song" (Jerry Crutchfield) - 2:21
 "The One Who Hung the Moon" (Gene Dobbins, Michael Huffman, Bob Morrison) - 2:50
 "Swimming Upstream" (Gary Nicholson, Bucky Jones) - 3:02
 "The Best Part of Texas" (Troy Seals, Eddie Setser) - 3:42
 "Ain't It Just Like Love" (Billy Burnette, Pat Robinson) - 2:31
 "(If I'd Only Known) It Was the Last Time" (Archie P. Jordan, Naomi Martin) - 2:45
 "Rising Above It All" (Jerry Foster, Bill Rice) - 2:50

Personnel

Glen Campbell - vocals
Brent Mason - electric guitar
Brent Rowan - electric guitar
Steve Gibson - acoustic and electric guitars
Weldon Myrick - steel guitar
Stuart Duncan - fiddle, mandolin
Michael Rhodes - bass guitar
Gary Lunn - bass guitar
Lonnie Wilson - drums
Eddie Bayers - drums
Paul Leim - drums
John Willis - acoustic guitar
David Hungate - bass guitar
Matt Rollings - piano
Johnny Neel - piano
Fletcher Watson - piano, synthesizer
Bob Mason - cello
Strings - Nashville String Machine
Background vocals - Louis Nunley, Curtis Young, Wayland Patton, Gregg Gordon, Steven Curtis Chapman

Production
Producer - Jerry Crutchfield
String Arrangements - Bergen White
"Somebody Like That", "Those Words", "I Will Be Here", "Swimming Upstream", "The Best Part Of Texas", "(If I'd Only Known) It Was The Last Time" digitally recorded at Masterfonics and Omni Sound Studio, Nashville, TN
"Love's Old Song", "The One Who Hung The Moon", "Ain't It Just Like Love", "Rising Above It All" analog recorded at Nightingale Recording Studio, Nashville, TN
Recording Engineers - Mark J. Coddington, Keith Compton, Joe Bogan
Assistants - Paula Montondo, Patrick Kelly, Steve Tveit
Mixed at Sound Stage Studio, Nashville, TN
Mix Engineer - John Guess
Assistant mix engineer - Marty Williams
Mastered by Glenn Meadows at Masterfonics
CD master tape prepared by Glenn Meadows
Digital editing by Milan Bogdan
Production coordination by Ginny Johnson
Art direction - Mickey Braithwaithe
Photography - Sandra Gillard

Charts
Singles

References

Somebody Like That
Somebody Like That
Somebody Like That
Albums produced by Jerry Crutchfield